Ulhas may refer to:

 Ulhas River in India

but also

People
 Ulhas Bapat (born 1950), Indian musician
 Ulhas Koravi Satyanarayan (born 1998), Indian basketball player

Similar terms
 Ulas